Georgy Yakovlevich Prokopenko (21 February 1937 – 5 May 2021) was a Soviet swimmer who competed at the 1960 and 1964 Summer Olympics. In 1964 he won a silver medal in the 200 m breaststroke and finished fourth in the 4 × 100 m medley relay. He won three European titles in these events in 1962 and 1966, and set two world records in the 100 m breaststroke in 1964. Between 1962 and 1964 he also set eight European records in the 4 × 100 m medley relay and in the 100 m and 200 m breaststroke disciplines.

Prokopenko was born on 21 February 1937 in Kobeliaky, Poltava Oblast, then part of the Ukrainian Soviet Socialist Republic, in the Soviet Union. He died on 5 May 2021 at the age of 84.

References

1937 births
2021 deaths
Ukrainian male breaststroke swimmers
Olympic swimmers of the Soviet Union
Swimmers at the 1960 Summer Olympics
Swimmers at the 1964 Summer Olympics
Olympic silver medalists for the Soviet Union
European Aquatics Championships medalists in swimming
Medalists at the 1964 Summer Olympics
Olympic silver medalists in swimming
Soviet male breaststroke swimmers
People from Kobeliaky
Sportspeople from Poltava Oblast